Grays Gate is a rural locality in the Toowoomba Region, Queensland, Australia.

History 
The locality is believed to be named after an early settler.

References 

Toowoomba Region
Localities in Queensland